is a railway station in Motomachi, Chūō-ku, Kobe, Hyōgo Prefecture, Japan.

It is one of the main stations serving the central business district of Kobe. The station is the closest access point to the Motomachi shopping district and to Nanking Town, one of Japan's three largest Chinatown districts.

Lines
JR West JR Kōbe Line (Tōkaidō Main Line) 
Hanshin Electric Railway Main Line, Kōbe Kōsoku Line

The JR and Hanshin platforms are separated and no interchange is possible without completely leaving one building and entering another; therefore there are technically two separate Motomachi stations, although they are often treated as one.

The JR station is served by local and rapid trains.

The Hanshin station is the western terminus  of the Main Line, although service continues west on the Kobe Rapid Railway.

JR West

Overview
There are 2 elevated island platforms serving 2 tracks each.

Hanshin Railway

Overview
There is an underground island platform serving 2 tracks.

Gallery

History 
Station numbering was introduced to the JR platforms in March 2018 with Motomachi being assigned station number JR-A62.

Surroundings
Kyūkyoryūchi-Daimarumae Station

References 

Railway stations in Hyōgo Prefecture
Railway stations in Japan opened in 1905
Railway stations in Kobe
Tōkaidō Main Line
Hanshin Main Line